The Nightly Disease is the second album by the Norwegian alternative rock band Madrugada.  Much darker than their debut Industrial Silence, the album has been described as 'depression caught on tape'.  In 2011 the album was remastered and re-issued with a bonus disc featuring much unreleased and unheard material.

Track listing

Certifications

References

2001 albums
Virgin Records albums
Madrugada (band) albums
Albums produced by John Agnello